Leucyl endopeptidase (plant Leu-proteinase, leucine-specific serine proteinase, leucine endopeptidase, spinach serine proteinase (leucine specific), spinach leucine-specific serine proteinase, Leu-proteinase) is an enzyme. This enzyme catalyses the following chemical reaction

 Hydrolysis of proteins. Preferential cleavage: Leu- in small molecule substrates

This enzyme is isolated from leaves of the spinach plant (Spinacia oleracea)

References

External links 
 

EC 3.4.21